Thunder Warrior (also known as Drug Traffikers) is a 1983 Italian action film written and directed  by Fabrizio De Angelis (credited as Larry Ludman). It had two sequels, one released in 1987 and the other in 1988. The premise borrows heavily from First Blood.

Premise
A Native American named Thunder returns home following a long absence and discovers a construction company that is destroying a native burial ground, which is a breach of the treaty signed a century ago between his grandfather with the US Government. His attempt to alert the local authorities results in him being escorted out of the county by one of the sheriff's deputies, who order him to stay out of town. Having done no wrong and after being assaulted by the construction workers, Thunder returns and the situation continues to escalate. Leading into a war between the lone native warrior and the entire sheriff department.

Cast
 Mark Gregory as Thunder
 Valeria Cavalli as Sheela
 Raimund Harmstorf as Rusty
 Bo Svenson as The Sheriff 
 Antonio Sabàto as Thomas
 Paolo Malco as Brian Sherman
 Bruno Corazzari as Frank
 Nazzareno Zamperla as Thomas's Friend
 Slim Smith as Grandfather to Thunder

Production
Parts of the film were shot in Monument Valley, Utah.

Sequels  
 Thunder Warrior II (1987) 
 Thunder Warrior III (1988)

References

External links
 

Italian action films
1983 action films
English-language Italian films
Films directed by Fabrizio De Angelis
Films scored by Francesco De Masi
Neo-Western films
Films shot in Utah
Redsploitation
1980s English-language films
1980s Italian films